Operational Display Systems are systems used for tracking the status of multiple objects in avionics.  Operational Display Systems are usually being developed by large countries' civil aviation authorities (such as the Federal Aviation Administration in the United States, or the main Service Providers in Europe, such as DFS, NATS, DSNA, ENAIRE,  MUAC, etc., coordinated by Eurocontrol in Europe), with inputs from technology companies and air traffic controllers associations.

Air traffic control systems gradually evolved from the old sweeping radar to modern computer-driven systems showing maps, weather information, aircraft routes and digitized radar tracks on an ergonomically-designed console.

Whereas in the past the information came only from a radar, current systems use inputs from a variety of sources.  Radar is still used (multiple sources instead of just one), but is now complemented by  transponder data (the aircraft sending out information regarding altitude and identifications) and soon satellite data (for more accurate positioning and overseas navigation).

As most data is now digital, this opens the way for extra functionalities to be embedded in the modern Operational Display System, such as trajectory prediction, conflict warnings, traffic flow management, arrival optimisation, etc. Two separate competing systems are currently operating within the US, Common ARTS (Automated Radar Terminal System (Lockheed Martin)) and STARS (Raytheon), with Common ARTS operating at the busiest facilities (New York, Dallas, Atlanta, Southern California, Chicago, Washington D.C. area, Denver, St. Louis, Minneapolis and San Francisco area) within the US.

On the display side, the round radar is being replaced by computer-driven cathode ray tubes, which now are being replaced by modern LCD flat screens in en route systems. However a great many US Air Traffic TRACON facilities and Towers still use the older cathode ray tube technology. Most of the larger TRACONs employ a 20" x 20" Sony color tube display; Common ARTS uses the ARTS Color Display (ACD) and the Remote ARTS Color Display (R-ACD), while STARS uses the Terminal Control Workstation (TCW) and Tower Display Workstation (TDW). Towers are slowly replacing old DBrite (cathode ray type remote displays) with an LCD type manufactured by Barco. However these display replacements are currently installed only at the busiest facilities with lower density traffic facilities slated for retrofit later.

Avionics